Łukasz Kubot and Marcelo Melo were the two time defending champions, but lost in the quarterfinals to Rohan Bopanna and Pablo Cuevas.

Bopanna and Cuevas went on to win the title, defeating Marcelo Demoliner and Sam Querrey in the final, 7–6(9–7), 6–7(4–7), [11–9].

Seeds

Draw

Draw

Qualifying

Seeds

Qualifiers
  Pablo Carreño Busta /  David Marrero

Qualifying draw

External links
 Main draw
 Qualifying draw

Erste Bank Open - Doubles
Vienna Open